Aliabad (also Romanized as `Alīābād and Aleabad; also known as Alvār) is a village in Sanjabad-e Gharbi Rural District, in the Central District of Kowsar County, Ardabil Province, Iran. At the 2006 census, its population was 179, in 38 families.

References 

Towns and villages in Kowsar County